Hemagudda  near Kammatadurga is a village in the Gangavathi taluk of Koppal district in the Indian state of Karnataka.  Hemagudda is located northeast to District Headquarters Koppal. 

Importance
Hemagudda is noted for the 14th-century Hemagudda Fort and the Dasara Festival.

See also
 Koppal
 Munirabad

References

Villages in Koppal district